Joseph Vaughan Russell (13 January 1890 – 1979) was a Scottish amateur football centre forward who played in the Scottish League for Queen's Park.

Personal life 
Russell worked as a commercial traveller. He served as a private in the Scottish Horse and as a sergeant in the Royal Engineers during the First World War, which included service in Egypt. Russell later had a successful business career, becoming a director of Charles Tennant & Co and managing the Lochaline optical glass mines during the Second World War.

Career statistics

References

1890 births
1979 deaths
Scottish footballers
Scottish Football League players
British Army personnel of World War I
Association football forwards
Queen's Park F.C. players
Scottish Horse soldiers
Date of death missing
Royal Engineers soldiers